Roger Andrew Thomas Jordan (born 26 May 1972) is a Barbadian sprinter. He competed in the men's 4 × 400 metres relay at the 1992 Summer Olympics.

References

1972 births
Living people
Athletes (track and field) at the 1992 Summer Olympics
Barbadian male sprinters
Olympic athletes of Barbados
Commonwealth Games competitors for Barbados
Athletes (track and field) at the 1994 Commonwealth Games
Athletes (track and field) at the 1995 Pan American Games
Place of birth missing (living people)
Pan American Games competitors for Barbados